The Furious Stakes is a City Tattersalls Club Group 2  Thoroughbred horse race for three-year-old fillies, at set weights, over a distance of 1200 metres at Randwick Racecourse, Sydney, Australia in September. Total prizemoney for the race is A$250,000.

History

Grade
 1986–1994 - Listed Race
 1995–2004 - Group 3
 2005 onwards - Group 2

Venue
 1984–1999 - Randwick
 2000 - Rosehill  
 2001–2003 - Randwick
 2004 - Warwick Farm
 2005–2010 - Randwick
 2011–2012 - Warwick Farm
 2013 onwards - Randwick

Distance
 1986–1999 – 1400 metres
 2000 – 1350 metres
 2001–2012 – 1400 metres
 2013 onwards - 1200 metres

Winners

 2022 - North Star Lass
 2021 - Jamaea
 2020 - Dame Giselle
 2019 - Libertini
 2018 - Pure Elation
 2017 - Formality 
 2016 - Foxplay 
 2015 - Speak Fondly 
 2014 - Winx  
 2013 - Bound For Earth
 2012 - Dear Demi
 2011 - Streama
 2010 - More Strawberries
 2009 - Melito
 2008 - Samantha Miss
 2007 - †race not held
 2006 - Just Dancing
 2005 - Mnemosyne
 2004 - Prisoner Of Love
 2003 - Shamekha
 2002 - Victory Vein
 2001 - Moonflute
 2000 - Unworldly
 1999 - Danglissa
 1998 - Sunline
 1997 - Stella Cadente
 1996 - Dashing Eagle
 1995 - Seattle Gem
 1994 - Danarani
 1993 - Angst
 1992 - Yodelay
 1991 - Bold Promise
 1990 - Twiglet
 1989 - Tristanagh
 1988 - Research
 1987 - Glory Girl
 1986 - La Cadeau

† Not held because of outbreak of equine influenza

See also
 List of Australian Group races
 Group races

References

 Australian Studbook - Tatts NSW Furious Stakes
 horseracinginfo.com.au

Horse races in Australia
Randwick Racecourse